Brooke Adams may refer to:

 Brooke Adams (actress) (born 1949), American actress
 Brooke Adams (wrestler) (born 1984), American professional model, dancer, and wrestler

See also
 Adam Brooks (disambiguation)
 Brooks Adams (1848–1927),  American historian and a critic of capitalism